Samuel Byrne was an Australian naïve painter and folk historian who visually chronicled the rise of Broken Hill, from its frontier days right through to the establishment of a modern city. Without any formal training, Byrne took to painting when he was in his seventies after retiring from a lifetime working on Broken Hill's mines. His painstakingly detailed panoramas of Broken Hill's township were discovered by Leonard French, who brought him to the attention of Sydney and Melbourne's art connoisseurs. Byrne is best known for painting his memories of subjects that held a personal fascination for him; Broken Hill's rabbit plagues, Sturt's desert peas, dust storms, industrial riots, and pioneering mining scenes. As a trade unionist and having first hand experience of the harsh mine conditions, his works are often imbued with a working-class consciousness and show a deep sensitivity to the plight of the victimised. Although the media often compared him to Grandma Moses, as James Gleeson writes, Byrne "paints in a manner that is so consistent that we are obliged to acknowledge it as a personal style."

Of Sam Byrne, John Olsen wrote "no [other] Australian painter has portrayed, with such enduring simplicity and humanity, the world of the 1890s." Elwyn Lynn described the folk painter as a "raconteur in paint". James Gleeson described him as a "genuine primitive", an "innocent of art", whose visual experience has not been filtered by conceptions of style or technique.

Biography

Early life
Sam Byrne was born Michael Eldrige Samuel, the second child of James and Elizabeth Burns, on 10 July 1883, in Humbug Scrub, South Australia in the Barossa Valley, South Australia. His Irish-born father was an itinerant worker who travelled between various Australian gold and silver rushes, seeking out fortune. His mother was Australian born. The pair met and married in the Barossa Goldfields, where they conceived their first two children. Prior to Sam Byrne's birth, his father had left to join the short-lived Mount Brown gold rush in Northern New South Wales. Following that, he joined the silver rush on the Barrier District, where he worked as a blacksmith on the Daydream and Umberumberka silver mines. When Sam Byrne was two years old, his father returned and relocated the family to the small silver mining town of Thackaringa, west of Broken Hill.

The next few years of Sam Byrne's life saw the birth of three more brothers. He attended a primary school in Thackaringa, under the auspices of an alcoholic teacher. In 1890 his father died from an injury incurred whilst shoeing a horse. The absence of widow's pensions at the time left Sam Byrne's mother with no means to support her young sons. She made the decision to move the family east to Broken Hill, where she could earn income as a washerwoman. Housed in a canvas hut without heating, and working long hours, she soon succumbed to pneumonia. Byrne himself fell victim to the unsanitary conditions of the early township, surviving a bout of childhood typhoid fever. He and his siblings were then adopted by two of his married aunts. He was sent to the Broken Hill Central Primary School, where he remained until he was old enough to work on the mines. A further family disruption occurred when his foster uncle abandoned the family for the Western Australian gold rush. He was never heard from again. To support the family, Byrne's foster aunt then took to washing duties, whilst Sam Byrne sold The Barrier Miner and collected bottles. Another income stream for Sam Byrne came during the great rabbit plagues of 1895–1896. The municipal council, incorrectly thinking that dead rabbits were causing a typhoid epidemic, paid rewards to townsfolk who collected the carcasses off the streets. Later in life, Byrne would become well known amongst art collectors for his paintings of the rabbit plagues.

Mining career
At the age of fifteen Sam Byrne started work on the BHP Mine, a company in whose service he would remain for the next fifty-one years. His employment was crucial to financially support his family following the sudden death of his older brother from pneumonia. Byrne was underage, however was admitted upon presenting his late brother's union registration card. Initially working as a messenger boy, around the age of seventeen he took on the hard labour of men's work: Breaking rock with picks, boring, timbering, shovelling ore into trucks and then pushing them along the drives to the shafts. He experienced harsh working conditions: hot and dusty mine shafts, no water, underground fires. Workmates were killed by falling rock, or poisoned from touching and breathing lead ore. Byrne himself narrowly escaped several cave-ins as the result of inadequate amounts of timber reinforcements being used on the mine stopes. Whilst engaged in hard labour, he often felt worried he would meet the same untimely death from miner's diseases or an accident as his workmates did. He has criticised the mining companies for their "heartless" treatment of workers in the early days; "when a man got killed he was sent straight to the morgue [but] if a horse got killed there was a hell of an inquiry a horse was far more important than a man."

Byrne was witness to several industrial disputes between Broken Hill's mine labourers and mining companies. As a nine-year old child he recalls the 1892 strike, triggered by proposed wage reductions as a result of low metal prices. To replace the striking workers, the mining companies imported contract labour "scabs" from South Australia and Victoria. This led to the workers losing the strike and accepting a wage reduction. Byrne and his childhood friends used to throw rocks on the houses of the scabs, and trip up mine officials who were delivering anti-union newspapers. He witnessed the striking miners, which included his foster uncle, capturing the scabs and subjecting them to a ritual of public humiliation, whereby they were covered in hot tar and feathers. 

Another industrial dispute, the Great Lock-out of 1909, resulted in the closure of two of Broken Hill's major mines, leaving over a thousand men without work. Byrne continued working but paid a union levy to support out-of-work miners. English socialist Tom Mann was brought into Broken Hill to act as an industrial organiser. G. D. Delprat, the general manager of BHP, in anticipation of riots, contacted the New South Wales premier Charles Wade, requesting police reinforcements to be sent from Sydney. Sam Byrne played in the Amalgamated Miner's Association's brass band, which lead the pickets in procession to the mine boundary. He was part of the audience of spectators who witnessed the police attack the procession of the locked-out miners. The riot culminated in the arrest of Tom Mann; the miners had lost their struggle. 

Shortly before the outbreak of the First World War, Byrne had a near death experience underground when his arm was savaged in a piece of machinery. The resulting injuries were severe enough to put him out of work for a whole year. Whilst recuperating at home, he decided that continuing underground labouring work was too dangerous, and so he studied to gain work as a surface engine driver. He joined the Federated Engine Drivers' and Firemen's Association (FEDFA) union. During the Big Strike of 1919, fought over poor working conditions, Sam Byrne was able to retain work as a engine driver to be put to use in case of the outbreak of fire. While the striking miners survived on the privations of potatoes and onions from union donations, Byrne fed his family with fresh produce he grew in his backyard garden. 

He retired from the mines in 1949 at the age of sixty-six, when he became eligible for the old-age pension.

Personal life
In 1908, on a trip to South Australia to work as a labourer on a salt pan, Sam Byrne courted his cousin Florence Pope. Florence came from a farming family along the banks of the Murray River. After exchanging letters over the coming years, she moved to Broken Hill and the couple married with Anglican rites in 1910. They bought their first house in the suburb of Railway Town, next to Byrne's foster aunt's house. The house was destroyed by a fire in 1911. Over the next few years, the couple had three sons.

Sam Byrne did not enlist to join the First World War due to his injury and domestic responsibilities. His youngest brother did enlist and was killed at Gallipoli. Likewise, he did not enlist in the Second World War as mining was designated a protected industry in Australia. Byrne's family were relatively insulated from the economic downturn of The Great Depression due to his specialised trade as an engine driver.  He secured scholarships to send his three sons to a teacher's college; adamant that they would not go to dangerous work on the mines. 

In his retirement, aside from painting, Sam Byrne was an enthusiastic member of the Old Age Pensioners Association, the Broken Hill Historical Society, and the Field Naturalists Society. He was an amateur geologist and keen fossicker. He would ride his bicycle out to the ruins of old mines and revisit the landscapes of his childhood.

Death
In 1973 Sam Byrne underwent an emergency operation to fix a stomach blockage. Unlikely to survive the anaesthetic, he sung a final tribute song to Ireland on the operating table before going under. Miraculously, having survived the operation, he returned home to paint. His output declined in the last few years, struggling with glaucoma and arthritis. In private letters to gallery owner Rudy Komon, Byrne confessed his worry about not being able paint for much longer due to his eyesight. In his last years, he struggled through Broken Hill's hot summers, spending only a few hours a day crouched in his rusty shed over his paintings. "It is here that I would like to die, at my easel" he said. By late 1977 the artist had to undergo another operation and was losing his stamina and appetite. In February 1978, he was hospitalised again. He died on 24 February 1978, unconscious and in no pain. He was interred at Broken Hill Cemetery. His funeral was poorly attended. Following his death, Broken Hill's Barrier Daily Truth published only a brief death notice. Some months later, the Sydney Morning Herald published a lengthy obituary and lamented that the artist's death had been unmourned by the very city he had "helped build from the very bowels of the earth."

Political and religious views
Like many Broken Hill miners who lived through the decades of union militancy so formative to trade unionism in Australia, Sam Byrne declared himself to be a socialist. As a young man he would read socialist literature, including the works of Marx and Engels, that he had obtained through his union. Of his political preferences, he declared "I think everybody would have a better living if the government controlled everything and instead of dividends going overseas [all the profits] would be returned to the people." He praised English socialist Tom Mann, who came to Broken Hill as a union organiser, as a being "great man – a true blue unionist fighting for the worker". Sam and Florence Byrne had a political opposition to war and were against conscription. Of his opposition to the Vietnam War, Byrne said "well if communism came to America the millionaires would have to give up their millions and start doing something useful."

Sam Byrne's religious views were pantheistic. He believed somewhat in Darwinism, somewhat in cosmic creationism. On the other hand, he thought the biblical story of creation was fictitious. He would argue with clergymen about their religious views. He would sometimes paint Broken Hill's churches, and attend church ceremonies with his wife Florence. Byrne was against missionaries interfering in Australia's indigenous society.

Career as a painter

Discovery
Sam Byrne's earliest artistic endeavours took place underground, where he would sketch scenes onto timbers deep in the mines where he worked. In retirement, his excursions with the local historical society and naturalists society provided him an opportunity to enjoy the landscapes and abandoned mines around Broken Hill. A technically astute drawer, he would make sketches of the scenery because he wanted some visual mementos to take home. It was at some point in the early 1950s when Byrne first dabbled with making paintings of his sketches. Without any commercial motivations, he started simply because he thought they'd be nice to have hanging on the walls at home.

Byrne's first forays into public exhibition took place after he viewed a local art exhibition and was unimpressed by the modernist style entries. He remarked to his brother that he thought he could create better paintings. His brother scoffed at the idea, and so Byrne rose to the challenge. At the following year's art competition, he submitted two works in poster paints on butcher's paper. Although he did not win a prize, his entries were highly commended by the judge. The judge, wanting to ensure Sam Byrne had every opportunity to improve on his materials and technique, referred him to the guidance of Florence May Harding. Harding was a commercial artist and art teacher at the Broken Hill Technical College, having taken her alma mater at the National Art School in Sydney. Becoming a family friend, she introduced Byrne to the requirements of being a professional artist and encouraged him to continue painting in his own characteristic style. For the next few years he continued to enter the annual Broken Hill art competition, and received prizes each year.

In 1960, the annual art competition was judged by Melbourne artist Leonard French. Without any hesitation, French awarded Sam Byrne first prize for his panorama of the Broken Hill township. French recalled it "had the absolutely beautiful quality of naïve painting." French was so impressed by Byrne that he offered to promote his paintings to Rudy Komon, a major contemporary gallery director in Woollahra, Sydney.

Commercial Scene
Byrne's first commercial exhibitions were organised, showing in group exhibitions in 1960 alongside works by Gil Jamieson - first at Melbourne's Museum of Modern Art of Australia, then touring up to Sydney's Rudy Komon Art Gallery. Opening the Rudy Komon show was dignitary Sir Edward Warren, chairman of the Colliery Proprietors' Association. In a first public acquisition, Hal Missingham, director of the Art Gallery of New South Wales, purchased one of Byrne's landscape paintings for the gallery's permanent collection. In 1963, Byrne's eightieth year, he was given his first one-man show at Rudy Komon Art Gallery, where he exhibited 45 works. The solo exhibition was commercially successful, many works selling within the first two hours. To meet demand, Byrne painted two additional rabbit plague paintings while on location in Sydney. Critical attention was also garnered from Sydney's top art critics, James Gleeson and Elwyn Lynn, both publishing generally favourable newspaper reviews. The following year, a Sam Byrne painting was featured on the cover of Art and Australia, in which John Olsen wrote of the contribution of several naïve painters to Australian art.

Due to developing arthritis and concern over the income affecting his old age pension, Sam Byrne only committed to a few more commercial exhibitions.“I don't think I am going to be bothered with any more big city exhibitions.. they take it out of a man, the bustle and the excitement”, he said.  His 1966 Rudy Komon show with friend Les Willis marked the end of his active exhibition career. It was around this time that there was a sudden demand for the work of Broken Hill artists. The demand was attributable to a yearning to discover a new nationalist pictorial language based on the arid landscapes of the outback. Despite a withdrawal from exhibiting in commercial galleries, Byrne still found plentiful buyers in the form of tourists and gallery agents who would visit his Broken Hill home gallery in Wolfram Street. Buying directly from the Byrne's proved lucrative for dealers, who could re-sell the purchased work for treble the price.

To oblige those who could not travel to Broken Hill, a mail order service was set up. Due to the overwhelming demand, Florence Byrne out of necessity stepped into a role as her husband's manager. She managed a host of mail order inquiries, managed financial transactions and negotiated with art dealers. Helped by continuing liaison with Rudy Komon, Byrne's paintings were sourced and acquired into many private and corporate collections worldwide. A long time buyer and personal correspondent was the art collector Margaret Carnegie. During this period of high buyer demand, Byrne found that certain scenes were more commercially successful. He had no qualms about revisiting these particular scenes, such as his rabbit plagues, producing dozens of copies with only slight variations. Byrne was also happy to take commissions for family history paintings from prominent society members whose ancestors had an important connection to Broken Hill. Amongst these commissions was a descendant of Charles Sturt, the artist Paul Delprat (great-grandson of mine manager G. D. Delprat), and Australian Prime Minister Harold Holt.

Beginning in 1961, Sam Byrne was a founding member and frequent exhibitor of the Willyama Arts Society; a Broken Hill initiative to encourage local artists and exhibitions. He was a respected member for his contribution to policy making and his efforts to promote it outside of Broken Hill. In 1973 a group of Broken Hill painters including Pro Hart, Jack Absalom and Hugh Schulz formed a charitable business group known as the Brushmen of the Bush. The group quickly found fame through the attentions of celebrities and a Qantas sponsorship to promote overseas their paintings of the Australian outback. Despite a close friendship with Hart and Schulz, Sam Byrne was never asked to join the Brushmen. This exclusion negatively affected Byrne's commercial saleability. Both the Brushmen of the Bush and Sam Byrne had their names registered at the Broken Hill Tourist Bureau, yet the Brushmen's galleries were the popular first port of call for the tourists.

In 1970 Broken Hill's mayor awarded Sam Byrne a certificate in recognition of his services to art. His works were mounted in a short exhibition at the Broken Hill Regional Art Gallery. When the gallery did not purchase any for their permanent collection, Byrne offered to donate them. The gallery refused the offer. During the last few years of his life he concentrated on painting a singular vision: a series of long panoramas of the Broken Hill Line of Lode, which included the BHP mine and smelters, as he had remembered it from the 1890s. With this subject matter he won two major acquisitive art awards; first in 1976 for the Broken Hill Regional Art Gallery, and in 1977 for the Swan Hill Regional Art Gallery. Following the latter acquisition, the director of the Swan Hill gallery decided to make collecting naïve art the new focus for the gallery going forward. Byrne was also a finalist in the Art Gallery of New South Wales' 1977 Wynne Prize for landscape painting, from which his painting of the BHP Mine and smelters was purchased by BHP for its Melbourne offices. 

A spate of publicity followed the prizes. Byrne was featured in two art theory books on Australian naive painters, as well as a television documentary broadcast on the ABC. There was a resurgence of interest from commercial galleries. Byrne allowed a single gallery director to buy up a significant portion of the family's private collection, despite his wife's previous insistence that these paintings would never be sold. Despite failing health, and determined to win a third acquisitive prize, Byrne embarked on one last panorama to immortalise Broken Hill's line of lode. The epic seven foot painting was entered into the annual art competition. It was not awarded any prizes and the gallery did not purchase it, instead going to an Adelaide gallery director. It was the final painting Sam Byrne exhibited.

Technique, style, and themes

Early Panoramas

From his childhood, Byrne had a fascination with maps and mapmaking. The works produced at the beginning of his artistic career are reminiscent of cartographic style. The cartographic impulse continued through his oeuvre, manifesting in his use of line, colour, his feel for space and his interest in the man made aspects of the desert landscape such as railway tracks and roads. His earliest documented paintings, dating from the late 1950s, take the form of detailed, large-scale panoramas of the Broken Hill township as it appeared from above. The works bear a striking resemblance to the early topographical drawings of Australia's colonial settlements. There is a focus on technical observedness, reflecting Byrne's desire to document his township exactly as he saw it, without taking any artistic liberties. Despite the need for accuracy, Sam Byrne never painted his townscapes en plein air. Instead he preferred to make pencil sketches on location directly onto the masonite, noting down colours. He would then paint over them at home, where he worked in an old tin laundry on the side of his house. To achieve the detailing on distant buildings and trees, the artist used a technique similar to pointillism. Author Geoffrey Lehman describes the technique as "miniaturisation", observing that the tiny houses "congregate and accrue like a colony of coral polyps." Taking up to 3 months to complete, fewer than ten panoramas are thought to have been created. Byrne would later suffer from failing eyesight and, out of physiological necessity, move on to subjects less concerned with microscopic finesse and the conventions of technical draughtsmanship.

Subject Matter
Much of the body of work from Sam Byrne's middle period depicts his memories of the early days of Broken Hill and its environs. He was primarily a landscape painter who populated his scenery with narratives of human activity. With a focus on the life of miners, civic and domestic life, as well as key events, Byrne's paintings were often of stories drawn from his own folk experience. Comparison has been made between Byrne's visual narrative style and the literary genre of the bush ballad. One arts critic remarked “one turns with genuine pleasure to the expansive humanity of Sam Byrne's storytelling. The old man has us enthralled by his tales of past experiences”. Byrne was concerned with documenting the whole social fabric of the early Broken Hill township. Several of his paintings depict the moral clash between Protestant fundamentalism and the drunken amoralism of miners. Amongst the many townsfolk found in Byrne's paintings there are depictions of outsider subjects such as Afghan cameleers and prostitutes. Their presence is culturally significant in that these characters were largely excluded by other photographers and artists documenting Broken Hill in the early 20th century. 

Aside from the lives of miners, Sam Byrne often painted scenes inspired by Broken Hill's unique natural environment and phenomena; dust storms, whirlwinds, rabbit plagues, mountain ranges, fields of Sturt peas in bloom. Of his dust storm paintings, John Olsen wrote that Byrne “manages to convey quite convincingly the feeling of a physical threat.”

Portrayal of Human Figures
Crowd scenes depicting town life in the early days of Broken Hill are a recurrent theme in Sam Byrne's paintings. So too are scenes of violent clashes between miners and law enforcement authorities; often watched on by townsfolk spectators. Sam Byrne's characteristic treatment of crowds is to paint giving frontality to human figures. By painting all characters facing the viewer, Byrne achieved a means to convey their emotional reaction to the folk story that is being depicted. Although his faces tend to be crude and cartoonish, the subtle positioning of dots in a character's eyes still manages to evoke their distinct emotional states. Painting the correct facial expression was of importance to Byrne; often his faces would build up like impasto in multiple attempts at achieving the correct state. Comparison has been drawn between Byrne's figures and the crowds in the London streetscapes of L. S. Lowry. For author Geoffrey Lehmann, Sam Byrne's human figures appear "puppet like", as if all actors on a staged narrative, small and standardised against a dominating landscape, and rarely with any emphasis on any individual figure. Byrne's focus on human subjects is significant to a region whose art was otherwise dominated by landscapes and mining scenes.

Composition
Sam Byrnes work from the 1960s onward tends to abandon the realism of orthodox painting that he strove for in his early Broken Hill panoramas. He began to mostly ignore the laws of diminishing perspective, in a way stylistically reminiscent of early Renaissance art. In reviews of Byrne's first solo exhibition, John Olsen and James Gleeson both felt that Byrne seemed simply not aware of the existence of technical problems within his compositions. Byrne would structure his paintings according to the elements of the narrative he wished to tell. He would use distortions and magnifications to emphasise the importance of particular objects within a landscape or narrative. Sometimes he distorted buildings in a way which displays multiple sides from the same perspective. His Sturt pea landscapes are an example of the use of magnification: a tiny flower in reality, is given gigantic proportions against the surrounding landscape. On other occasions, cartoonish manipulations of human proportions were used for comic effect. John Olsen observes that another aspect of Byrne's "unusual spacial abilities" is his use of impasto on foreground objects that he considers more important in the schema.

Byrne has been considered an innovator in his approach to solving the problems of painting the Australian interior. Despite having parallels with mainstream artists, his techniques are notable in that Byrne developed them in geographic isolation; with no lessons nor access to textbooks about painting. James Gleeson, in reviewing a Sam Byrne exhibition, wrote of charming results when untutored artists like Byrne provide their own solutions to pictorial problems without relying on the conventions taught at art schools. The featureless, flat expanse of the Australian outback presented a problem for painters in the pastoral tradition, as it lacked picturesque props such as trees or foreshores to make the images interesting. Byrne solved this problem by a compression of vision, not unlike the approach used by Fred Williams. His paintings often show a tilting of the landscape; relegating the horizon and sky to the upper quarter of his compositions. With a larger land area, Byrne filled the landscape with the objects and characters of his narrative. Where trees were lacking, Byrne replaced them with the structures of early mining equipment. Particularly in his final Line of Lode paintings, he made use of certain structures in the mining industry that provide strong vertical and horizontal lines. These have the effect of intersecting the picture planes, drawing the viewer's eye through the composition. Such vertical structural devices included poppet heads, smelter stacks, and red streams of molten slag being poured. Horizontal structural devices included railway bridges, cross-sectional views of mines, and drifting smoke plumes atop smelter stacks which bend at right angles to the tops of smelter chimneys. Biographer Ross Moore compares Byrne's mining panoramas to the industrial landscapes of Jan Senbergs in that both express a "machine romanticism" in the love of architectural forms of industry. Sam Byrne also has parallels with artist John Olsen. Both artists found a way of using abstracted forms such as blobs and squiggles to capture the textured surface detail of the outback landscape.

Use of Colour
Warm colour palettes, enhanced by gloss varnish are a characteristic of most of Sam Byrne's paintings. He deployed colour in a bold way that helped achieve harmony, pattern, and a sense of balance in his compositions. In scenes showing cut-away earth, all possible earthy colours are used, sometimes arranged like rainbows, capturing Broken Hill's rich veins of mineral deposits. In his landscapes, yellow ochres are contrasted against the artificially bright red used for Sturt's pea flowers and vegetation. His skies are almost always clear and chalky blue, populated by well defined clouds resembling "surreal zeppelins". Byrne would usually paint the sky first and then work his way down to the foreground. John Olsen likened Sam Byrne's colour schemes to Breughel: "he delights in cherry reds, happy colours [which] dance over the picture plain with glee and wonder."

Media
Sam Byrne's first painting media was watercolour. Due to the impracticalities of shipping paintings with glass, he abandoned the media in the early 1960s. For the most part of his career, Byrne painted on masonite with a mixture of oils and synthetic gloss enamels. He would often outline in the thicker oil paint and then fill using enamels. Dulux house paints were his preferred medium for clouds and skies on account of the shine and brilliance they afforded. In his latter years Byrne switched to the exclusive use of Dulux and Taubman's gloss enamels. The slippery nature of this new media led to a shift in painting technique. Forms were no longer outlined; paint was tipped on and then spread into position. To prevent the paint running, Byrne would paint with the board lying flat upon his bench. In many paintings depicting silver mining, Sam Byrne sprinkled actual galena dust (silver-lead ore) into the wet paint to represent where ore is being depicted. The mineral pieces provide an additional tactile and sparkly quality to the compositions; becoming somewhat stellar when used in underground mining scenes. Although the use of galena dust has been described as "a bizarre urge for realism" resulting in an unnatural appearance, Byrne felt the look it achieved was completely truthful to nature.

Line of Lode Panoramas
In the last few years of his life, Sam Byrne was suffering from arthritis and glaucoma. His output declined. A hole at the centre of his vision meant he could not discern the details of what he wished to paint. He had trouble maintaining vertical lines, consequently characters and chimneys appeared to lean forward at slight angles. Troublesome too were colours, which were impossible to distinguish between without the help of a friend who would organise the paint pots into an order for him. Paintings produced during this period are described as having a certain abstracted quality, crude in individual elements but possessing immense energy in their total effect. Thematically, the last few years of life saw Byrne concentrate obsessively on painting long panoramas of Broken Hill's Line of Lode as he remembered it from the pioneering era. The larger scale of these works allowed Byrne, almost blind, to perceive enough detail and was more accommodating to irregularity of lines and forms.

Legacy

Biographer and artist Ross Moore argues in Sam Byrne: Folk Painter of the Silver City that the artist's contribution to Australian landscape painting is as significant as that of Fred Williams, John Olsen, Russell Drysdale or Sidney Nolan, and that his artistic status has not been fully appreciated. Artistically, Byrne's contribution was as an innovator in finding his own pictorial language to portray the Australian outback. Culturally, his value as a folk historian has left behind a legacy of works that contribute to Australia's social and cultural heritage. In Moore's opinion, Australia had been lacking in consciousness of the history of colonial settlement in far Western New South Wales. While artist S. T. Gill portrayed the life of miners during the Victorian gold rush, Byrne is the only artist to have recorded pioneering life on the silver rush of the Barrier District in the 1880s. As the last of his generation, Sam Byrne's decision to paint his memories opened a window to the past that was on the verge of being forgotten. 

Byrne's strike paintings in particular are historically significant to researchers of early trade unionism in Australia. They are unparalleled elsewhere in Australian art, and scarce photographic records remain of some of the events depicted. As an insight into historic mining techniques, Sam Byrne has provided the fullest visual history of the underground working environment, from the colonial days of candlelight, picks and hammers, to the electric lights and pneumatic drills of modern mining. His accurate recollection of pioneering mining processes is reflective of knowledge gained through a close working relationship with machinery across his lifetime. Ross Moore expressed disbelief that, although Byrne's paintings were clearly historical documents of the growth of mining and civic life in Broken Hill, BHP and the Broken Hill City Council had consistently failed to buy more for their collections.

Collections
Works by Sam Byrne are held in the permanent collections of the

National Gallery of Australia
Art Gallery of New South Wales
State Library of New South Wales
Queensland Art Gallery
National Gallery of Victoria
Heide Museum of Modern Art
Newcastle Art Gallery
Mildura Arts Centre
Swan Hill Regional Art Gallery
Broken Hill Regional Art Gallery

Selected works
External links to selected works

Arrest of Tom Mann 1909 Lockout Riot Broken Hill (c1965) Broken Hill Regional Art Gallery
Cecelia Resists Police – Unusual Transport Early Days Broken Hill (c1972) Broken Hill Regional Art Gallery
The Silver City (1957) Broken Hill Regional Art Gallery
Dust Storm Approaching Broken Hill (c1966) Heide Museum of Modern Art 
Frog Marching Rioters 1909 Broken Hill (1963) Broken Hill Regional Art Gallery
Prayer's and Curses Moslem's Pray Bullocky Curse's (sic)(c1969) National Gallery of Victoria
Sturt Peas and Pinnacles (c1965) Private Collection 
Rabbit Plague 1896 (1963) Private Collection
Rabbit Plague Rounding up Rabbits (c1970) Private Collection 
North Broken Hill Ltd. Mine (c1963) Private Collection
Fall of Ground Early Days Broken Hill (c1965) Broken Hill Regional Art Gallery
Camel and Bullock Teams Transport Ore from Broken Hill District Mines 1890 (c1966) Private Collection 
BHP Mine and Viaduct 1890 (1976) Broken Hill Regional Art Gallery
Broken Hill Line of Lode 1893 – Memory Painting by Sam Byrne (1977) Private Collection

References

Referenced books

Naïve painters
1883 births
1978 deaths
20th-century Australian painters
Australian folklorists
People from Broken Hill, New South Wales